Philadelphia Lodge No. 2 BPOE, also known as the Philadelphia Athletic Club, was a historic Benevolent and Protective Order of Elks (BPOE) lodge occupying 306-320 N. Broad Street in the Logan Square neighborhood of Center City Philadelphia.  The lodge, built between 1922 and 1925, was a 13-story building.  The BPOE moved into the new lodge from the 4-story building at 1320–1322 Arch Street, built in 1904–1906 and designed by Francis Caldwell and Edward Simon, that still stands.

The Elks occupied the bottom five floors, with residential/hotel accommodations in the higher eight floors.  The lower floors included meeting rooms, restaurants, ballrooms, and auditoria.  The entrance featured a two-storey portal framed in limestone and capped by a giant keystone.

Although being added to the National Register of Historic Places in 1984, the building was purchased by Hahnemann University for $2.35 million in 1991 and was demolished the following year.

See also

References
Notes

External links

Clubhouses on the National Register of Historic Places in Philadelphia
Buildings and structures completed in 1925
Callowhill, Philadelphia